Ectemnius ruficornis is a species of square-headed wasp in the family Crabronidae.

Subspecies
These two subspecies belong to the species Ectemnius ruficornis:
 Ectemnius ruficornis ruficornis (Zetterstedt, 1838)
 Ectemnius ruficornis taiwanus Tsuneki, 1968

References

Crabronidae
Articles created by Qbugbot
Insects described in 1838